Dreamland is a studio album by the alternative rock band Aztec Camera, released in 1993.

The album peaked at No. 21 on the UK Albums Chart.

Critical reception
Trouser Press wrote that Roddy Frame "approaches a nirvana of cerebral passion on 'Valium Summer', 'Let Your Love Decide' and other ethereal treats." In a 2021 review of an Aztec Camera collection, Pitchfork thought that "Dreamland isn’t completely devoid of the indie rock arrangements that characterized earlier Aztec Camera releases, and even its most experimental tendencies feel firmly at home within the band’s extended catalog."

Track listing
All songs written by Roddy Frame.

"Birds" – 4:56
"Safe in Sorrow" – 4:56
"Black Lucia" – 4:00
"Let Your Love Decide" – 5:03
"Spanish Horses" – 4:35
"Dream Sweet Dreams" – 3:27
"Pianos and Clocks" – 4:53
"Sister Ann" – 5:13
"Vertigo" – 4:54
"Valium Summer" – 5:54
"The Belle of the Ball" – 3:24

Personnel
Roddy Frame – vocals, guitar, keyboards
Ryuichi Sakamoto
Rosie Ania
Victor Bailey
Steve Bernstein
Barry Finclair
Romero Lubambo
Sylvia Mason-James
David Palmer
Paul Powell
Gary Sanctuary
Vivian Saunders
Steve Sidelnyk
Gary Tibbs
Naná Vasconcelos

References

1993 albums
Aztec Camera albums
Warner Records albums
Albums produced by Ryuichi Sakamoto